McBride/Charlie Leake Field Aerodrome  is located  north northwest of McBride, British Columbia, Canada.

References

Registered aerodromes in British Columbia
Regional District of Fraser-Fort George